Raphael Sbarge (born February 12, 1964) is an American actor and filmmaker. He is perhaps best known for his roles as Jake Straka on The Guardian (2001–04), Jiminy Cricket / Dr. Archibald Hopper on Once Upon a Time (2011–18) and Inspector David Molk on the TNT series Murder in the First (2014–16). He is also known for voicing Carth Onasi in Star Wars: Knights of the Old Republic (2003), RC-1262 / "Scorch" in Star Wars: Republic Commando (2005) and Kaidan Alenko in the Mass Effect trilogy (2007–12).

Early life
Raphael Sbarge was born into a theater-oriented family in New York City. His mother, Jeanne Button (1930-2017), was a professional costume designer. His father, Stephen Sbarge, was an artist, writer and stage director who named his son after the Renaissance artist Raphael. His parents divorced. In 1981, his mother married MacDonald Eaton, a production designer and painter. In her private life, she was known as Mrs. Button-Eaton. Raphael Sbarge began his career at age 5 on Sesame Street.

Career

Stage
Sbarge made his stage debut in 1973 in Edward Bond's stage production Lear. In 1981, the played in Joseph Papp's Shakespeare in the Park production of Henry IV, Part 1. The following year he made his Broadway debut opposite Faye Dunaway in the short-lived play The Curse of an Aching Heart. Other New York stage credits include Hamlet (1982), Ah, Wilderness! (1988), Ghosts (1988), The Twilight of the Golds (1993), The Shadow Box, and Voices in the Dark (1999).

Film
Sbarge's film credits include Risky Business (1983), Vision Quest (1985), My Man Adam (1985), My Science Project (1985), Carnosaur (1993), The Hidden II (1993), Babes in Toyland (1997), Independence Day (1996), BASEketball (1998), Message in a Bottle (1999), Pearl Harbor (2001), Home Room (2002) and The Duel (2015).

Television
Sbarge has appeared in numerous television series and television movies, including A Streetcar Named Desire with Ann-Margret in 1984; the pilot of the Fox series Werewolf in 1987; Billionaire Boys Club, Back to Hannibal: The Return of Tom Sawyer and Huckleberry Finn in 1990; Murder 101 with Pierce Brosnan and Final Verdict with Treat Williams  in 1991; Breast Men with Chris Cooper; Quicksilver Highway with Christopher Lloyd in 1997; and Introducing Dorothy Dandridge with Halle Berry in 1999.

He had recurring roles in five episodes of Star Trek: Voyager in 1996, and in the first four episodes of the sixth season of 24. From 2001 to 2004, Sbarge was a regular cast member of The Guardian, starring Simon Baker. He voiced the character Professor Zei in the second season Avatar: The Last Airbender episode "The Library". He was in an episode of Six Feet Under. In 2007, he appeared in a two-part episode of Journeyman. In 2009, he appeared in an episode of The Mentalist. In 2010, he was in "Practically Perfect", a season five episode of Dexter, as Jim McCourt, an Internal Affairs Agent.

He had a recurring role as Howard Aucker on The Young and the Restless. He played Brian McGuire on Better Days, which lasted for five weeks before being canceled. In 2011, he first appeared in Once Upon a Time, playing the dual roles of Archie Hopper, a therapist, and his fairy tale counterpart, Jiminy Cricket from Pinocchio. In 2013, he played Larry Hermann on Chicago Fire. He played Inspector David Molk, a philosophizing SFPD homicide inspector, on TNT's 2014 series, Murder in the First. In 2016, he made a cameo appearance as the deceased father of Jimmy McGill on the television series Better Call Saul.

Video games
He also has voice acted for video games such as Grim Fandango, Star Wars: Knights of the Old Republic, and Star Wars: Knights of the Old Republic II: The Sith Lords as Carth Onasi; as RC-1262 "Scorch" in Star Wars: Republic Commando; and as Kaidan Alenko in the Mass Effect series.

Directing
In 2013, Sbarge began directing Web series, serving as executive producer and director of On Begley Street and Jenna's Studio. His 2017 short film The Bird Who Could Fly premiered at the Asians on Film Festival. The Bird Who Could Fly, won Best Director, Best Ensemble, and Audience Awards at several Asian festivals around the US.  He filmed Broadway actor Marty Moran in his Obie Award winning play called The Tricky Part, which deals with the complicated issue of male sexual abuse.  It played many festivals around the US, winning Best Director at the Awareness Festival.  

Sbarge's 2019 documentary LA Foodways was nominated for an Emmy Award in the Education/Information category. LA Foodways is a one-hour feature documentary and a six-part series that he directed and produced. It debuted on KCET-PBS, which his production company, Wishing Well Entertainment, co-produced with the network.  He has directed and produced several other films for KCET that have aired.  His current feature, called Only in Theaters, had its theatrical premier at 7 theatres in Los Angeles in Nov. 2022.   The film follows a fourth generation family business,  a beloved art house cinema chain with ties to the origins of Hollywood called The Laemmle Theaters.  Receiving rave reviews in the LA Times, Daily News, Film Treat, and Film Week, it was called “Essential viewing for every filmgoer,” "Beautiful and complicated,” "Beautiful and timely,” “An American story,”  and “This film could not be any more important.”   Only in Theaters is opening in New York at the IFC, and New Plaza Cinema’s on Jan 18th and 20th.

Environmentalism
Sbarge, actor Ed Begley, Jr., and Rachelle Carson Begley launched an environmentalist non-profit organization called Green Wish, aimed at donating to local green organizations through donations at retailers throughout the country. Sbarge was also executive producer of On Begley Street, a web series chronicling the deconstruction of Begley's home and the "building of North America's greenest, most sustainable home."

Personal life
Sbarge is in a relationship with his life partner artist/writer Jenna DeAngeles

Filmography

Film

Television

Video games

Theatre

References

External links
 Raphael Sbarge Official website
 
 
 LLA Archives entry

1965 births
Living people
Male actors from New York City
American male film actors
American male soap opera actors
American male stage actors
American male television actors
American male video game actors
American male voice actors
American environmentalists
American people of Russian-Jewish descent
20th-century American male actors
21st-century American male actors